HMS Charybdis was a 21-gun Royal Navy Pearl-class corvette launched on 1 July 1859 at Chatham Dockyard.

She served on the East Indies Station and the China Station between 1860 and 1861. She sailed to Vancouver in early 1862 joining the Pacific Station. She served at the Pacific Station until 1867, when she was assigned to the Australia Station arriving in March 1867. She left the Australia Station on November 1868 and returned to the Pacific Station in early 1869. On 30 March, she was driven ashore. Repairs cost £843.

As part of the Royal Navy's 1869 Flying Squadron, she visited a number of ports in South America, Australia and Japan before returning to Vancouver. On 23 February 1870, Charybdis ran aground between Blunden Island and Pender Island, Colony of British Columbia. Repairs cost £227. Nobody was found to be to blame for the grounding. In 1870 she sailed to Plymouth for refit. In 1873 she was assigned to the China Station and conducted anti-piracy patrols in the Straits of Malacca. During the Southern Malayan state disputes in 1874, she in conjunction with HMS Hart kept the peace. In February 1875, she ran aground on the Meander Shoal, off Singapore, Straits Settlements. She was refloated with the assistance of a number of tugs.

In October 1880, she was lent to the Canadian government as a training ship, until returned by Canada in 1882. She was sold at Halifax, Nova Scotia in 1884 for breaking up.

Citations

References
Bastock, John (1988), Ships on the Australia Station, Child & Associates Publishing Pty Ltd; Frenchs Forest, Australia.

External links
HMS Charybdis at the Naval Database website
HMS Charybdis at the William Loney website

 

Pearl-class corvettes
1859 ships
Ships built in Chatham
Naval ships of Canada
Second French intervention in Mexico
Maritime incidents in March 1869
Maritime incidents in February 1870
Maritime incidents in February 1875